The Mattamuskeet National Wildlife Refuge is a federally protected wildlife refuge located within Hyde County, North Carolina, United States. North Carolina's largest natural lake, Lake Mattamuskeet, is located entirely within the National Wildlife Refuge.

It is home to the mammalian species white-tailed deer, river otters, red wolves, bobcats, and black bears.

The Lake Mattamuskeet Pump Station, also known as Mattamuskeet Lodge, was listed on the National Register of Historic Places in 1980.

See also
List of largest National Wildlife Refuges

References

External links
 Mattamuskeet NWR, USFWS

Protected areas of Hyde County, North Carolina
National Wildlife Refuges in North Carolina
Protected areas established in 1934
1934 establishments in North Carolina